Kyntaw geir (IPA /'kəntau gəir/, named for its first line, 'kyntaw geir a dywedaw', 'the first speech I will utter') is a medieval Welsh englyn-poem. It is a relatively rare example of religious poetry in the englyn form.

Contents and style

In the assessment of Jenny Rowland, 'the narrator-persona displays very human foibles, including the attempt to deny them. This naturalism makes it tempting to view the poem as a personal lyric, but it is undoubtedly misleading. The slightly bumbling, overly sincere narrator of "Kintaw geir" has a shrewd observer of human nature behind him. The incredible impression of spontaneity also conceals art and very tight organization.' The poem opens with the pilgrim preparing himself for his journey and seeking God's protection, perhaps alluding to other journey prayers like the Old English Journey Charm. However, his preparations are disturbed by a sneeze, which seems clearly to have been viewed as a bad omen. In stanzas 4-7 he contemplates the journey to Rome before him and in 8-10 prepares his horse. However, he continues to worry about bad omens, revealing his inner anxiety. The poem closes in 11-13 with the narrator successfully focusing his thoughts on the religious purpose of his journey, with an appropriate escalation in the elaborateness of the verse, closing with a prayer of intercession.

Text

As edited and translated by Jenny Rowland, the poem reads:

Manuscripts and dating

Jenny Rowland judges that Kyntaw geir dates from around the eleventh or maybe the twelfth century. Unlike many early englynion, Kyntaw geir is attested already in the thirteenth-century Black Book of Carmarthen. It is also attested in the late fourteenth-century Red Book of Hergest, and was also in the White Book of Rhydderch. Although it now lost from the White Book due to damage, it attested in two later manuscripts descended from the White Book, Peniarth 111 (made by John Jones of Gellillyfdy in 1607), whose spelling is very close to the White Book's, and London, British Library, Add. MS 31055 (made by Thomas Wiliems in 1596), which is a less conservative copy. National Library of Wales 4973 section b contains the poem. Its relationship to the other manuscripts is complex and may represent a conflation of multiple medieval sources, but it seems to have at least some independent value as a witness to the lost archetype of the poem. It is fairly clear that all these manuscripts descend from a lost common original, to which they are all fairly similar, making the creation of a critical edition of the poems relatively straightforward.

Editions and translations

 Jenny Rowland, Early Welsh Saga Poetry: A Study and Edition of the ‘Englynion’ (Cambridge: Brewer, 1990) (includes edition pp. 452–53 and translations pp. 499–500)

References

Welsh-language poems